Bor Airport is an airport in South Sudan.

Location
Bor Airport  is located in Bor County, Jonglei State, in central South Sudan, near the city of Bor.

The geographic coordinates of this airport are: 6° 11' 24.00"N, 31° 36' 0.00"E (Latitude: 6.1900; Longitude: 31.6000). The airport has a single 1280-meter long unpaved runway.

Overview
Bor Airport is a small civilian airport that serves the city of Bor and surrounding communities.

See also
 Bor, South Sudan
 Jonglei State
 List of airports in South Sudan

References

External links
 Location of Bor Airport At Google Maps

Airports in South Sudan
Jonglei State
Greater Upper Nile